Fuat Kalkan (born 13 February 1988 in West Berlin) is a German-Turkish football midfielder.

Kalkan represented Turkey in an under-21 friendly international against Ukraine on 10 February 2009.

References

External links 
 

1988 births
Living people
Footballers from Berlin
German people of Turkish descent
Turkish footballers
Turkey under-21 international footballers
Association football midfielders
BFC Preussen players
Hertha BSC players
Hertha Zehlendorf players
Tennis Borussia Berlin players
Türkiyemspor Berlin players